Kōzō Akino is a Japanese politician who has served as a member of the House of Councillors of Japan, since 2010. He represents the National proportional representation block as a member of the Komeito party. He currently serves on the following committees:

 Committee on Financial Affairs (Director)
 Committee on Discipline
 Special Committee on Okinawa and Northern Problems
 Deliberative Council on Political Ethics

Early life 
Akino was born on July 11, 1967 in the Hyogo Prefecture of Japan. He graduated from the Nagasaki University School of Medicine in 1992. He also earned a doctorate in Biomedical Sciences from that same university, in 1996.

Career

Medical career 
Prior to his election to the House of Councillors, Akino worked as professor of medicine and directed offices in the Ministry of Health, Labour and Welfare. A summary of his career is below:

 1996-2000: Assistant professor in the School of Medicine, Nagasaki University.
 2000-01: received specialized instruction at Cedars-Sinai Medical Center in Los Angeles, California.
 2001-06: Lecturer in the School of Medicine, Nagasaki University.
 2006-08: Assistant Director of the Disease Control Division of the Health Service Bureau, Ministry of Health, Labour and Welfare.
 2008-09: Assistant Director of the Blood and Blood Products Division of the Pharmaceutical and Food Safety Bureau, Ministry of Health, Labour and Welfare.
 2009-10: Director of the Tokyo Airport Quarantine Branch, Tokyo Quarantine Station.

Political career 
In 2010, he was elected to the House of Councillors. He is currently in his second term, which will expire in 2022. During his terms in office he has served as chairman of several different committees in the House of Councillors, including:

 2014-16: Special Committee on Disasters
 2016-18: Committee on Judicial Affairs
 2018-20: Committee on General Affairs
 2020–present: Committee on Financial Affairs

He has also briefly served in the Cabinet. In 2012 he served as Parliamentary Secretary of the Environment.

References 

Japanese politicians
Japanese physicians
1967 births
Living people